Felice Vinelli (Genoa, circa 1774 – 1825) was an Italian painter, during the Neoclassic period.

He became professor of painting at the Academy of Fine Arts of Genoa. Giuseppe Isola was one of his pupils.

References

1774 births
1825 deaths
18th-century Italian painters
Italian male painters
18th-century Italian male artists